John Gerald "Gerry" Driscoll III (1924 – March 12, 2011) was an international yachting champion and businessman from San Diego, California. He competed in the defense portion of four America's Cup races (1964, 1967, 1970, and 1974), and was part of the organizational effort for two others. His innovative year-round training regimen for the 1974 race permanently changed the way teams prepare for the America's Cup. As a competitor, organizer, ambassador and businessman, he is credited with helping to put San Diego on the sailing map internationally, and as one of the first San Diegans to compete in the America's Cup races, he raised the profile of the America's Cup on the West Coast.

Sailing career

America's Cup

In 1964, he skippered the trial horse Vim in the America's Cup defense qualifying races. In 1967 he was the project manager and skipper of Columbia, the first America's Cup entry from the West Coast. In 1970 he served as tactician on the defense candidate Valiant.

It was in 1974 that he "changed forever how the (America's Cup) event was sailed." At that time the standard America's Cup calendar was that the boats were built the winter before the event, and crew training began four or five months before the actual races. But Driscoll trained and drilled his crew throughout the winter in the calm waters off San Diego, while his rivals were all in dry dock. His boat Intrepid came close to winning the defender competition that year, but lost to Courageous in the final race due to a broken backstay. His year-round training program became the standard for future America's Cup efforts.

He was also the general manager for the challenger Eagle in the 1986–87 race, and helped the San Diego Yacht Club organize the 1992 races.

Other sailing
 He won the international Star championship in 1944.

 He won the Lipton Cup three times, in 1959, 1960, and 1970.
 He won the match race Congressional Cup in two consecutive years, 1965 and 1966, during which time his record was 18 and 0.

He was inducted into the San Diego Hall of Champions in 1977.

He was named San Diego Yachtsman of the Year in 1966 and 1974.

Business
He and his brother Harlan founded a boat yard in 1947. Driscoll Boat Works eventually became a major presence in the Southern California marine industry including a number of yacht construction, repair, and maintenance facilities in San Diego Bay and Mission Bay, as well as yacht brokerages and Driscoll's Wharf and Marina.

Community
He led the modernization of the Juniors program at the San Diego Yacht Club. He also founded the San Diego Yachting Cup, one of San Diego's top annual sailing events.

Personal life
Driscoll was a seventh-generation Californian. One of his maternal ancestors was a soldier who accompanied Father Junípero Serra, founder of the system of California missions.

A longtime San Diego resident, he had seven children. He died in his La Jolla home on March 12, 2011.

Achievements

References

1924 births
2011 deaths
American male sailors (sport)
1974 America's Cup sailors
Businesspeople from San Diego
People from La Jolla, San Diego
San Diego Yacht Club sailors
1970 America's Cup sailors
1967 America's Cup sailors
1964 America's Cup sailors
Star class world champions
World champions in sailing for the United States
20th-century American businesspeople